The Fontainebleau Miami Beach (also known as Fontainebleau Hotel) is a hotel in Miami Beach, Florida. Designed by Morris Lapidus, the luxury hotel opened in 1954. In 2007, the Fontainebleau Hotel was ranked ninety-third in the American Institute of Architects list of "America's Favorite Architecture". On April 18, 2012, the AIA's Florida Chapter ranked the Fontainebleau first on its list of Florida Architecture: 100 Years. 100 Places.

The Fontainebleau Miami Beach is located on Collins Avenue and is owned by the Soffer family controlled Fontainebleau Resorts.

History

The hotel was built by hotelier Ben Novack on the grounds of the former Harvey Firestone estate. Novack owned and operated the hotel until its bankruptcy in 1977.

The Fontainebleau is noted for its victory in the landmark 1959 Florida District Courts of Appeal decision, Fontainebleau Hotel Corp. v. Forty-Five Twenty-Five, Inc. 114 So. 2d 357, in which the Fontainebleau Hotel successfully appealed an injunction by the neighboring Eden Roc Hotel to prevent construction of an expansion that blocked sunlight to the Eden Roc's swimming pool. The Court rejected the Eden Roc's claim to an easement allowing sunlight, in favor of affirming the Fontainebleau's vertical property rights to build on its land. It stated that the "ancient lights" doctrine had been unanimously repudiated in the United States.

In the 1970s, a suite in the hotel was used by members of the Black Tuna Gang to run their operations.  This is recounted in the 2011 documentary Square Grouper, which follows the burgeoning marijuana-smuggling trade of the mid-to-late 1970s. It was at this time that large amounts of the drug were being shipped to southeastern Florida; the film alleges that more than ninety percent of the United States' illicit demand was being met through such channels.

In 1978, Stephen Muss bought the Fontainebleau Hotel for $27 million, thus rescuing it from bankruptcy. He injected an additional $100 million into the hotel for improvements and hired the Hilton company to manage it. In 2005, the Muss Organization sold the Fontainebleau to Turnberry Associates for $165 million.

The hotel closed a large part of its property in 2006, though one building remained open to hotel guests, and the furnishings were available for sale. The expanded hotel and its new condominium buildings re-opened in November 2008.

On December 22, 2008, the Fontainebleau was added to the National Register of Historic Places.

In popular culture
The Fontainbleau is a prominent feature in contemporary culture, appearing in numerous movies and television shows, musical lyrics, and nationally televised sporting and other events, including:

21st century
In 2019, the Fontainebleau appears in the third season of the Amazon series The Marvelous Mrs. Maisel in a scene in which Midge Maisel (played by Rachel Brosnahan) and Susie Myerson (played by Alex Borstein) stay at the resort while on tour with Shy Baldwin. In one scene, Midge is shown descending the grand staircase in the ornate lobby.

Also in 2019, the Fontainebleau, billed as the Riviera Grand Hotel, was the setting for the pilot of the Grand Hotel TV series pilot. After the pilot was filmed and ABC picked up a full order of episodes, the cast and crew headed to Los Angeles, where a mini-replica of the Fontainebleau was constructed. The exterior shots shown throughout the season are actually the real Fontainebleau.

The Fontainebleau appears in the Season 4 episode of The Sopranos titled "Calling All Cars", which first aired on November 24, 2002.

1990s
The Fontainebleau is featured in the 1992 film The Bodyguard starring Whitney Houston. Also in 1992, the hotel appears in final scene of The Specialist, an action film starring Sylvester Stallone and Sharon Stone.

1980s
The Fontainebleau is one of the primary settings for the 1988 comedy sequel Police Academy 5: Assignment Miami Beach with the film's characters staying there during the movie and many of the film's scenes filmed there.

The Fontainebleau acts as the unmentioned location for a widely popular scene in 1983's Scarface where Manny, played by Steven Bauer, gets slapped in the face after trying to win over a girl by sticking out his tongue to her.

1970s
On January 29, 1977, boxer Roberto Durán retained his WBA world Lightweight title with a 13th-round knockout over Vilomar Fernandez in a bout that was televised live by CBS from the hotel. 

The Fontainebleau is the title subject of a song written by Neil Young and performed by the Stills-Young Band on their 1976 album Long May You Run, which was recorded at the hotel.

1960s
The Fontainebleau is featured in the 1964 James Bond film Goldfinger,in the sweeping aerial shot that follows the opening credits and accompanies composer John Barry's big-band track "Into Miami". It is the hotel where Jill Masterson (played by Shirley Eaton) is murdered by the villainous Oddjob (played by Harold Sakata).

The hotel is repeatedly mentioned by Allan Sherman in his 1962 comedy song, "The Streets of Miami". 

The Fontainebleau is depicted in the 1960–1962 television series Surfside 6 about two detectives living and working aboard a houseboat moored directly across the street from the hotel. Supporting character Cha Cha O'Brien was an entertainer who worked at The Boom Boom Room in the hotel. Only establishing shots of the hotel were used; the series was filmed entirely at Warner Bros. studios in Burbank, California.

In March 1960, Frank Sinatra videotaped an ABC television special at the hotel, The Frank Sinatra Timex Show: Welcome Home Elvis, as part of his regular Timex-sponsored series to welcome back Elvis Presley following his two-year military service in West Germany. Broadcast on May 12, 1960, Nielsen reported a 41.5% rating and 67.7% share, with an audience at 50 million, making it the top-rated show of the year and Sinatra's top-rated television appearance of his 21-year career (1960–1981).

The hotel was the setting for Jerry Lewis's 1960 comedy film, The Bellboy.

1950s
The swimming pool is shown in the 1959 film A Hole in the Head. Tony Manetta (played by Frank Sinatra) attends a party there for businessman and friend Jerry Marks (played by Keenan Wynn). Miami Mayor Robert King High had a cameo during the gala scene.

Renovations

Fontainebleau's grand re-opening on November 18, 2008 marked the end of a two-year, $1 billion transformation. Special care was taken to preserve many of the original design elements, including the "Staircase to Nowhere" (formally called the "floating staircase"). The hotel's elaborate re-opening celebrations included hosting the annual Victoria's Secret fashion show.

Restaurants and nightclubs in the complex include:
 Stripsteak by Michael Mina (formerly named FB Steakhouse and originally named "Gotham Steak")
 Scarpetta (Italian)
 Hakkasan (Cantonese)
 La Côte (bi-level poolside bar and grille)
 Blade Sushi
 Vida (Pan American)
 Fresh (Snacks & Gelato)
 LIV Miami
 Bleau Bar
 Glow Bar
 Michael Mina Pizza & Burger (formerly Arkadia)
 Chez Bon Bon (pastries and chocolates; formerly named Solo)

Pronunciation
The local pronunciation of the hotel's name is the Anglicized "fountain blue" rather than the normal French pronunciation of the word.

References

External links 

 Fontainebleau Resort - Miami Beach website

Hotels in Miami Beach, Florida
Hotels established in 1954
Hotel buildings completed in 1954
National Register of Historic Places in Miami-Dade County, Florida
Miami Modern architecture
Modernist architecture in Florida
Morris Lapidus buildings
1954 establishments in Florida